Philip Gephart Shadrach (or Shadrack) was an American soldier born in Somerset County, Pennsylvania, on September 15, 1840. He enlisted with Company "K" of the 2nd Ohio Infantry Regiment for three years on September 20, 1861, at a place called the Mitchell Salt Works in Ohio as a private. He enlisted as "Charles P. (Perry) Shadrach".

See also
List of Andrews Raiders

Great Locomotive Chase
Union Army soldiers
1840 births
1862 deaths
People executed by the Confederate States of America by hanging